Tripteroides sp. No. 2 is a species of mosquito in the genus Tripteroides which has not yet been formally named.  It is endemic to Sabah, Malaysian Borneo. T. sp. No. 2 is placed in the subgenus Rachionotomyia.  In its larval stage, T. sp. No. 2 develops in the pitchers of Nepenthes species, especially N. rajah. As such, it is considered a nepenthebiont.

References

 Clarke, C.M. 1997. Nepenthes of Borneo.  Natural History Publications (Borneo), Kota Kinabalu, p. 39.

Culicinae
Nepenthes infauna
Undescribed arthropod species